Dive Bomber (known as Night Raider in Europe) is a video game developed by Acme Animation in 1988 for the Commodore 64. It was ported to Atari ST, Apple II, ZX Spectrum and MS-DOS.

Plot
The player pilots a Grumman Avenger while hunting for the German battleship Bismarck. The player first must learn to fly the aircraft. The player' Avenger takes off from and lands on the aircraft carrier Ark Royal. The player selects one of four missions by drawing straws during the opening game sequence.

Gameplay
Dive Bomber has digitized sound. The player uses a mouse on the Atari ST and Amiga versions to make menu selections and fly the plane. The game employs several screens. The player uses the Pilot's Screen to fly the plane, with such controls as the brake, vertical speed, artificial horizon, and torpedo release. The player uses the Engineer's Screen to select fuel tanks and to set the fuel mixture and throttle. The player uses the Navigator's Screen to view a map of the surrounding area and the locations of enemy aircraft and ships. The player uses the Tail Gunner's Screen to see the enemy aircraft attacking from the rear, where they can be machine-gunned. Tips for flying the Avenger can be found in the player's manual.

Reception
The game was reviewed in 1989 in Dragon #141 by Hartley, Patricia, and Kirk Lesser in "The Role of Computers" column. The reviewers gave the game 4½ out of 5 stars. 1991 and 1993 Computer Gaming World surveys of strategy and war games gave it one half star out of five, criticizing "mediocre graphics, documentation and an overall lack of panache".

Reviews
ST Action - Sep, 1988
ACE (Advanced Computer Entertainment) - Sep, 1988
Sinclair User - Aug, 1988
The Games Machine - Nov, 1988
The Games Machine - Aug, 1988
Your Sinclair - Oct, 1988
Computer and Video Games - Aug, 1988
The Games Machine - Oct, 1988
New Computer Express - Dec, 1988
Computer Gaming World - Nov, 1991

References

External links
Dive Bomber at MobyGames
Review in Antic

1988 video games
Amstrad CPC games
Atari ST games
Cancelled Amiga games
Commodore 64 games
DOS games
U.S. Gold games
Video games developed in the United Kingdom
ZX Spectrum games